Paul Ryan (born 1970) is an American politician, elected Speaker of the House in 2015.

Paul Ryan may also refer to:

Sportspeople
Paul Ryan (biathlete) (born 1970), British Olympic biathlete
Paul Ryan (boxer) (born 1965), English boxer of the 1990s
Paul Ryan (hurler) (born 1988), Irish hurler
Paul Ryan (Australian footballer) (born 1962), Australian rules footballer

Musicians
 Paul Ryan (singer) (1948–1992), English songwriter and record producer, part of singing duo "Paul & Barry Ryan"
 Paul Ryan (musician and agent) (born 1970), English rock guitarist for Cradle of Filth and The Blood Divine
 Paul Ryan (guitarist) (born 1971), American rock guitarist and vocalist for Origin

Other people
 Paul William Ryan (1906–1947), American author
 Paul Ryan (video artist) (1943–2013), American video artist and communications theorist
 Paul Ryan (actor) (1945–2015), American actor and television personality
 Paul Ryan (cartoonist) (1949–2016), American comics artist 
 Paul F. Ryan (born 1969), American film producer, director, and teacher
 Paul S. Ryan, vice president for policy and litigation for Common Cause

Fictional characters
Paul Ryan (As the World Turns), character on American daytime serial
Paulie "Wheels of Fury" Ryan, character in American video game Tony Hawk's Underground 2

See also
Ryan (surname)